Hua Hin railway station is a train station located in Hua Hin Subdistrict, Hua Hin District, Prachuap Khiri Khan Province, and is located  from Thon Buri railway station and 850 m (0.5 mi) from Hua Hin Beach by Damnoen Kasam Road.  It is a class 1 railway station on the Su-ngai Kolok Main Line.

On the premises, there is an old 305 Unit Baldwin steam locomotive on display. Hua Hin Station has been considered to be the most beautiful station in Thailand. Therefore, it is popular as a landmark and photo spots of Hua Hin for visitors.

History 
The Southern Line third phase between Cha-am Station to Hua Hin opened in November 1911, and the line continued to Wang Phong Station in January 1914.  The original station building was built in 1910, and rebuilt in 1926, by Prince Purachatra Jayakara (former commander of the Royal State Railways of Siam) to the current Victorian building today. The design was taken from the planned Siam Rat Museum Expo, intended to be built in 1925 at Lumphini Park, but was never built due to the death of King Vajiravudh and the cancellation of the expo by King Prajadhipok.

In 1967, Colonel Saeng Chulacharit (former minister of the State Railway of Thailand) coordinated the relocation of the Sanam Chandra Palace Railway Pavilion from Sanam Chandra Palace, to Hua Hin and it was renamed to "Phra Mongkut Klao Pavilion". Nowadays, it is one of the main attractions at the station.

Hua Hin station is currently being reconstructed as part of the double-tracking project of the Southern Line. It will become an elevated station once it is complete.

Train services 
 Thaksinarath Express 31/32 Krung Thep Aphiwat – Hat Yai Junction – Krung Thep Aphiwat
 Thaksin Express 37/38 Krung Thep Aphiwat – Sungai Kolok – Krung Thep Aphiwat
 Special Express 39/40 Krung Thep Aphiwat – Surat Thani – Krung Thep Aphiwat
 Special Express 41/42 Krung Thep Aphiwat – Yala – Krung Thep Aphiwat (suspended due to COVID-19 pandemic)
 Special Express 43/44 Krung Thep Aphiwat – Surat Thani – Krung Thep Aphiwat
 International Express 45/46 Krung Thep Aphiwat – Padang Besar – Krung Thep Aphiwat
 Express 83/84 Krung Thep Aphiwat – Trang – Krung Thep Aphiwat
 Express 85/86 Krung Thep Aphiwat – Nakhon Si Thammarat – Krung Thep Aphiwat
 Rapid 167/168 Krung Thep Aphiwat – Kantang – Krung Thep Aphiwat
 Rapid 169/170 Krung Thep Aphiwat – Yala – Krung Thep Aphiwat
 Rapid 171/172 Krung Thep Aphiwat – Sungai Kolok – Krung Thep Aphiwat
 Rapid 173/174 Krung Thep Aphiwat – Nakhon Si Thammarat – Krung Thep Aphiwat (suspended due to COVID-19 pandemic)
 Ordinary 261/262 Bangkok (Hua Lamphong) – Hua Hin – Bangkok (Hua Lamphong)
 Ordinary 251/252 Thon Buri – Prachuap Khiri Khan – Thon Buri
 Ordinary 254/255 Lang Suan – Thon Buri – Lang Suan

Former services 
 International Express 35/36 Bangkok – Butterworth – Bangkok (ceased 2016)

Station layout

Current station

New station

Sources 
 
 
 
 
 รายงานประจำปี กรมรถไฟหลวง พ.ศ. 2469

References 

Railway stations in Thailand
Buildings and structures in Prachuap Khiri Khan province
Railway stations opened in 1911
Unregistered ancient monuments in Thailand